Montmélian station (French: Gare de Montmélian) is a railway station located in Montmélian, Savoie, south-eastern France. The station is located on the Culoz–Modane railway and Grenoble–Montmélian railway. The train services are operated by SNCF.

Train services

The station is served by regional trains (TER Auvergne-Rhône-Alpes) towards Chambéry, Grenoble, Lyon, Annecy, Modane and Bourg-Saint-Maurice.

References

Railway stations in Savoie